Hafiz Saeed Khan (1972 – 26 July 2016), also known as Mullah Saeed Orakzai, was an Islamic militant who served as the Islamic State emir for its Khorasan province, which is active in Afghanistan and Pakistan, from January 2015 until his death in July 2016. Prior to 2015, Khan was a senior commander in the Tehrik-i-Taliban Pakistan and initially a member of the Afghan Taliban.

Early life and family
Saeed was born in 1972 in the town of Mamozai in the Orakzai Agency, in the Federally Administered Tribal Areas of Pakistan near the Afghan border, and got his early education from a local cleric, Maulana Shabit, before moving to the Hangu District of Khyber Pakhtunkhwa, where he was admitted to the local school known as Darululoom Islamia Hangue, one of his classmates, Maulana Shahidullah, remembering him as a good student, having memorized the entire Qur’an in just one year, and for also being particularly peaceful, while in terms of private life, he first married his cousin, having two sons and a daughter, before taking another wife from the North Waziristan District.

As opposed to most Talibans, who are Deobandis, Saeed was a Panjpiri, Panjpir being a town in the Swabi District of Khyber Pakhtunkhwa known for its seminaries with Salafi tendencies, producing many militants who thus later felt a natural affinity for the ideology of the Islamic State.

Islamic militancy

Tehrik-i-Taliban Pakistan
After the September 11 attacks, Saeed went to Kabul to fight against the United States invasion of Afghanistan with the Afghan Taliban. He remained in Kabul for two years.

He became close to  Baitullah Mahsud, who formed the Tehrik-i-Taliban Pakistan in 2007 and became its leader. He appointed Saeed to the majlis ash-shura and made him emir for Orakzai Agency.

On August 2009, Baitullah Mahsud was killed in an American drone strike. A dispute arose as to the leadership of the TTP, with some commanders wanting Hakimullah Mahsud to assume the leadership, while Saeed wanted his ally Wali Ur Rahman to become the leader. According to Abdul Saboor Khan, a renowned analyst of tribal affairs, "The TTP split in two groups after Baitullah's killing and Saeed was not happy over the differences," In 2013 Hakimullah was himself killed in an American drone strike. "Saeed was one of the three main contenders for the top slot of the TTP chief, and I think he was disheartened when Fazlullah was nominated", Khan said.

Islamic State
Saeed, who as a TTP commander was known for his Salafi tendencies to the point he attacked Hanafi seminaries, had already personally joined IS on 11 May 2013.

Few months after Pakistani offensive in North Waziristan against TTP, Saeed formally left the TTP on 15 October 2014, along with seven other Taliban leaders, creating a new group called Tehrik-e Khilafat  Pakistan (TKP), and pledged allegiance to Islamic State leader Abu Bakr al-Baghdadi. The other men who left alongside him were the TTP's former spokesman, Shahidullah Shahid; its Khyber Agency chief, Gul Zaman Fateh; Peshawar chief Mufti Hassan Swati; Kurram Agency chief Hafiz Dawlat Khan;commander in Waziristan, Abdul Bahar Mehsud;Bajaur commander Abu Bakr and Hangu chief Khalid Mansoor.

Saeed's position as head of IS Khorasan was confirmed in a video message released by the group on 11 January. The video features a message by Shahidullah Shahid.

The 13th issue of Dabiq, titled The Rafidah from Ibn Saba' to the Dajjal and published 19 January 2016, features an interview with Saeed.

US sanctions
On 29 September 2015, the United States Department of the Treasury sanctioned Saeed alongside 15 other Islamic State leaders. According to the Department of the Treasury, "Khan, as leader of ISIL-K, plays a central role in expanding ISIL’s operations in the region, commanding militants and coordinating the delivery of supplies and munitions, the travel of associates, and other arrangements. In mid-2015, Khan appointed ISIL representatives in Kunar Province and Nangarhar Province, Afghanistan and approved funding for the establishment of a training camp for ISIL fighters in western Afghanistan. ISIL militants under Khan’s command had taken control of several districts in Nangarhar Province in mid-2015".

Death
On 12 July 2015, the Afghan intelligence agency, the National Directorate of Security, claimed that Saeed was killed in a strike carried out by US-led coalition forces in coordination with intelligence provided by the spy agency, though the United States never confirmed such an operation. The Islamic State rejected the claim, but the strike did kill Shahidullah Shahid and Gul Zaman, according to senior IS leader Abdul Rahim Muslim Dost.

On 12 August 2016, the United States announced that Hafiz Saeed Khan was killed in a U.S. airstrike in Achin district of Afghanistan's Nangarhar Province. There was no immediate response from the group itself, and it was initially unknown who would succeed him.  He was succeeded by Abdul Hasib, who was in turn killed by Afghan and US Special Forces in Nangarhar on 27 April 2017.

References

1972 births
2016 deaths
Assassinated ISIL members
Islamic State of Iraq and the Levant members
Islamic State of Iraq and the Levant in Afghanistan
Tehrik-i-Taliban Pakistan
Tehrik-i-Taliban Pakistan members
Taliban members
Islamic State of Iraq and the Levant and Pakistan
Leaders of Islamic terror groups
People from Orakzai District
Pakistani Islamists
Salafi jihadists